Albert Walter Hilton (9 July 1862 – 4 September 1935) was an English cricketer active from 1891 to 1895 who played for Sussex. He was born in Alfriston and died in Brighton. He appeared in 29 first-class matches and bowled left arm medium pace. He scored 182 runs with a highest score of 28 and took 89 wickets with a best performance of seven for 47.

Notes

1862 births
1935 deaths
English cricketers
Sussex cricketers
People from Alfriston